Nan Jeanne Aspinwall Gable Lambell (February 2, 1880 in New York – October 24, 1964) was the first woman to ride on horseback across North America alone. She rode from San Francisco to New York from September 1, 1910, arriving on July 8, 1911 on a bet from Buffalo Bill, whose Wild West show she performed in with her husband. She rode her Thoroughbred mare, Lady Ellen, on the journey.

She was born in New York under the name Nan Jeanne Aspinwall. She performed as an oriental dancer as well as a horsewoman, sharpshooter, and roper. She also had a vaudeville act with her husband.

Recognition
The actress Penny Edwards appeared as Nan Gable in the 1958 episode, "Two-Gun Nan," of the syndicated anthology series, Death Valley Days. In the story line, sharpshooter Nan, affiliated with William F. Cody's Wild West Show, sets out on a daring thoroughbred horse ride from San Francisco to New York City to prove that a woman could undertake such a task, which required 180 days. Robert "Buzz" Henry (1931-1971) played her husband, Frank Gable, and William O'Neal (1898-1961) was cast as Cody. Still living in 1958, Nan Gable appeared with series host Stanley Andrews at the conclusion of the episode.

A book about her life was published in 2007.

Bibliography

References

1880 births
1964 deaths
American female equestrians
Sportspeople from New York City